Laurent Nuñez-Belda (born 19 February 1964) is a French civil servant and independent politician who has been serving as Head of the National Center of Intelligence and Counter-Terrorism (CNRLT) since 2020. From 2018 until 2020, he was as Secretary of State to the Minister of the Interior in the government of Prime Minister Édouard Philippe. He served as director-general of the General Directorate for Internal Security (DGSI) from 2017 to 2018.

Early life and education
Nuñez studied law and joined the civil service in 1989. In 1999, he graduated from the École nationale d’administration (ENA).

Career
In 2012, Nuñez became a directeur de cabinet at the Paris Police Prefecture, and in 2015 he was appointed as police prefect in Bouches-du-Rhône.

As part of the reorganisation of the French intelligence services Nuñez was appointed as director-general of DGSI on 22 June 2017, and succeeded Patrick Calvar. He pursued a new policy of "openness."

On 16 October 2018 Nuñez served as Secretary of State to the Minister of the Interior, under the leadership of minister Christophe Castaner. He was especially responsible for the coordination of the intelligence services and the police.

In July 2020, Nuñez was appointed Head of the National Center of Intelligence and Counter-Terrorism (CNRLT), succeeding Pierre de Bousquet de Florian.

References

1964 births
Living people
Politicians from Bourges
University of Tours alumni
École nationale d'administration alumni
French people of Spanish descent
La République En Marche! politicians